Kathy Jordan and Anne Smith defeated the defending champion Martina Navratilova and her partner Pam Shriver in the final, 6–2, 7–5 to win the women's doubles tennis title at the 1981 Australian Open.

Betsy Nagelsen and Navratilova were the defending champions, but they competed with different partners that year, Nagelsen with Candy Reynolds and Navratilova with Shriver. Nagelsen and Reynolds lost in the first round to Chris Newton and Brenda Remilton.

Seeds
Champion seeds are indicated in bold text while text in italics indicates the round in which those seeds were eliminated.

Draw

Final

Top half

Bottom half

External links
 1981 Australian Open – Women's draws and results at the International Tennis Federation

Women's Doubles
Australian Open (tennis) by year – Women's doubles